Chasseur was the name ship of her class of four destroyers built for the French Navy in the first decade of the 20th century.

Design and description
Designed to displaced , the ships displaced  at deep load. Their crew numbered 77–79 men.

The Chasseur class was powered by three Parsons direct-drive steam turbines, each driving one propeller shaft using steam provided by four Normand boilers. Chasseur handily exceed her designed speed during her sea trials, reaching .

The primary armament of the Chasseur-class ships consisted of six  Modèle 1902 guns in single mounts, one each fore and aft of the superstructure and the others were distributed amidships. They were also fitted with three  torpedo tubes. One of these was in a fixed mount in the bow and the other two were on single rotating mounts amidships.

Construction and career

Chasseur was ordered from Chantiers et Ateliers Augustin Normand and was launched from its Le Havre shipyard on 20 February 1909. The ship was completed in November 1909. She participated in the First World War and was condemned in October 1919.

References

Bibliography

Chasseur-class destroyers
Ships built in France
1909 ships